Joseph Arthur Gosnell Sr.  (June 21, 1936 – August 18, 2020) was a Canadian tribal leader who led the Nisga'a people of northern British Columbia.

The son of Eli and Mary Gosnell, he was born at Arrandale Cannery and grew up in the village of New Aiyansh where he lived.

He received his formal education at St. Michael's Residential School in Port Alberni, British Columbia. As a young man he worked as a fisherman. He later served as band councillor and became active in the Native Brotherhood of British Columbia, of which he eventually became chairman. He was also a member of the Pacific Salmon Commission. He served for many years on the Nisga'a Tribal Council, of which he was elected President in 1992. In these various positions he was instrumental in bringing modern medical care, education, and resource management to the Nass River Valley. He was the chief Nisga'a representative in the negotiations that led to the signing of the Nisga'a Treaty on 4 August 1998, the first modern treaty between a British Columbian First Nation, Canada, and British Columbia. In November, 2000 he was elected President of the new Nisga'a Lisms government.

A fluent speaker of the Nisga'a language, he was a member of the Gitlaxt’aamiks Ceremonial Dancers. He held the noble name Sim'oogit Hleek. He was married to the former Audrey Adele Munroe with whom he had seven children: Marilyn Arlene, Joseph Wayne, Sharon Marjorie, Theodore Allen, Frank Curtis, Keith Andrew and Kevin Wesley.

He had received four Honorary Doctorate of Laws degrees — from Royal Roads University in Colwood, near Victoria on October 17, 1997; from the Open Learning Agency in Burnaby on May 7, 1999; from Simon Fraser University in 2000; and from the University of Northern British Columbia on May 26, 2000. He received the Humanitarian Award from the Canadian Labour Congress in Toronto on May 6, 1999.

In 1999 he received the Order of British Columbia. In 2000, Chief Gosnell received the Lifetime Achievement Award from the National Aboriginal Achievement Foundation, now Indspire. In 2001, he was named an Officer of the Order of Canada and was promoted to Companion in 2006. In 2002 he received the Queen's Golden Jubilee Medal.

In 2012, he served as the first Visiting Distinguished Indigenous Scholar in Residence at the Vancouver School of Theology.

On May 31, 2019 he was sworn in as the University of Northern British Columbia's seventh Chancellor.

References

 Gosnell speech of 1998-12-02
 Order of British Columbia citation
 Canada Gazette Part I, Vol. 135, No. 13
 Gosnell speech on signing of treaty
 Joseph Gosnell Biography
 Rose, Alex (2001) Spirit Dance at Meziadin: Chief Joseph Gosnell and the Nisga'a Treaty. Madeira Park, British Columbia: Harbour Publishing. 

1936 births
2020 deaths
20th-century First Nations people
21st-century First Nations people
Companions of the Order of Canada
Indigenous leaders in British Columbia
Indspire Awards
Members of the Order of British Columbia
Nisga'a people